The Antigua and Barbuda men's national tennis team represents Antigua and Barbuda in Davis Cup tennis competition and is governed by the Antigua and Barbuda Tennis Association.

History
Antigua and Barbuda competed in its first Davis Cup in 1996.  Their best result was third in Group III in 1997. After the 2001 tournament, they went inactive and did not compete again until 2017.

Current team (2022) 

 Jody Maginley
 Cordell Williams
 Kyle Joseph
 Ron Murraine
 Carlton Bedminster

See also
Davis Cup
Antigua and Barbuda Fed Cup team

External links

Davis Cup teams
Davis Cup
Davis Cup